This is a List of City of Santa Monica Designated Historic Landmarks.

Ordinance
As the 1975 Santa Monica Centennial approached, the City Council created the Historical Site Committee, and adopted the Landmarks and Historic District Ordinance on March 24, 1976. The Santa Monica Landmarks and Historic Districts Ordinance was amended in 1987 and again in 1991, to create a more comprehensive preservation program. The ordinance established a seven-member appointed Landmarks Commission with the power to designate Structures of Merit and Landmarks, and to make recommendations to the City Council regarding the designation of potential Historic Districts.

Criteria
The Landmarks Commission may approve the landmark designation of a structure, improvement, natural feature or an object if it finds that it meets one or more of the following criteria:

 It exemplifies, symbolizes, or manifests elements of the cultural, social, economic, political or architectural history of the City.
 It has aesthetic or artistic interest or value, or other noteworthy interest or value.
 It is identified with historic personages or with important events in local, state or national history.
 It embodies distinguishing architectural characteristics valuable to a study of a period, style, method of construction, or the use of indigenous materials or craftsmanship, or is a unique or rare example of an architectural design, detail or historical type valuable to such a study.
 It is a significant or a representative example of the work or product of a notable builder, designer or architect.
 It has a unique location, a singular physical characteristic, or is an established and familiar visual feature of a neighborhood, community or the City.

Listing of the City of Santa Monica Designated City Landmarks

See also

 National Register of Historic Places listings in Los Angeles County, California

References

External links
Historic Preservation in Santa Monica

Lists of places in California
 Historic Landmarks
Santa Monica
 
Santa Monica
Heritage registers in California
Lists of buildings and structures in California
Locally designated landmarks in the United States